Bianca-Andreea Costea (born January 26, 2005, in Galaţi) is a Romanian swimmer who is competing in the 50 meter and 100 meter freestyle events at the 2020 Summer Olympics. She won a gold medal in the 50 meter freestyle at the 2019 European Youth Summer Olympic Festival.

References 

Living people
2005 births
Romanian female freestyle swimmers
Olympic swimmers of Romania
Swimmers at the 2020 Summer Olympics
Sportspeople from Galați
21st-century Romanian women